Ridestore AB is an online-focused retailer of snowboard, ski, and outdoor apparel and streetwear, founded in 2006. Ridestore AB is a privately held company based in Gothenburg, Sweden which serves Europe and North America under three brand names.

 Ridestore AB: A multi-brand e-commerce store operating only in Europe, selling their proprietary brands Dope Snow and Montec-wear along with other well known snow and outerwear brands.
 Dope Snow: An in-house snow apparel brand established in 2008, that is sold in the United States and Canada.
 Montec: An in-house snow apparel brand established in 2016, that is sold in the United States and Canada.

History 
Ridestore AB was founded in 2006 by Emil Hellberg and his teenage brother Linus Hellberg. Linus was motivated to start an e-commerce business out of a spare room in his parents' home, when he discovered that the American outdoor sport apparel brands he was interested in were not sold by any e-retailers in Sweden. Linus dropped out of school to run Ridestore AB, and was joined by his brother, Emil Hellberg.  By 2017, Ridestore had become one of Sweden's largest e-retailers. Successful expansion into North America and other parts of Europe have resulted in rapid financial growth.

Ridestore AB acquired the Dope clothing trademark in the USA and Canada from EPOD America LLC, owned by Rob Gough, in 2020.

Awards and recognition 

 In 2017, Ridestore AB was recognized as having one of the top 100 e-commerce websites in Sweden by IDG.
 In 2020, Ridestore AB was recognized by Computer Bild magazine as one of the fastest growing e-commerce Motor, Sports and Outdoor brands of 2021.

References

Swedish companies established in 2006
Organizations based in Gothenburg